is a former Japanese football player.

Playing career
Nariyama was born in Kyoto Prefecture on May 20, 1971. After graduating from Kindai University, he joined Japan Football League club Kyoto Purple Sanga based in his local in 1994. He played many matches as side back from first season and the club was promoted to J1 League from 1996. However his opportunity to play decreased in 1996 and he retired end of 1996 season.

Club statistics

References

External links

kyotosangadc

1971 births
Living people
Kindai University alumni
Association football people from Kyoto Prefecture
Japanese footballers
J1 League players
Japan Football League (1992–1998) players
Kyoto Sanga FC players
Association football defenders